Edina Kocan (born 27 February 2002) is a Luxembourger footballer who plays as a midfielder for Dames Ligue 1 club Racing FC and the Luxembourg women's national team.

International career
Kocan made her senior debut for Luxembourg on 20 September 2020 during a 0–3 friendly loss against Bulgaria.

References

2002 births
Living people
Women's association football midfielders
Luxembourgian women's footballers
Luxembourg women's international footballers